Fadil Berisha is an Albanian-American fashion photographer living in New York City. He was once the official photographer for Miss Universe, Miss USA, and Rolex.

References

Albanian photographers
American photographers
Living people
1973 births
Yugoslav emigrants to the United States
People from Tropojë